Mychaljo "Mike" Czuczman (born 27 May 1953) is an English former professional footballer who played as a defender in the Football League for Grimsby Town, Scunthorpe United, Stockport County and York City, in non-League football for Skegness Town and Boston United, in the North American Soccer League for San Jose Earthquakes, and was on the books of Preston North End and Hull City without making a league appearance.

References

1953 births
Living people
Footballers from Carlisle, Cumbria
English footballers
Association football defenders
Preston North End F.C. players
Grimsby Town F.C. players
Scunthorpe United F.C. players
Stockport County F.C. players
San Jose Earthquakes (1974–1988) players
York City F.C. players
Hull City A.F.C. players
Skegness Town A.F.C. players
Boston United F.C. players
English Football League players
North American Soccer League (1968–1984) players
English expatriate sportspeople in the United States
Expatriate soccer players in the United States
English expatriate footballers